Frisiphoca is an extinct genus of phocid belonging to the subfamily Phocinae. It is known from fossils found in the late Miocene of Belgium.

Taxonomy
There are two species of Frisiphoca, F. aberratum and F. affine. Both were previously assigned to Monotherium, but Dewaele et al. (2018) found those species generically distinct from the Monotherium type species and placed them in their own genus, Frisiphoca.

Fossils
Fossils of Frisiphoca aberratum and F. affine occur in the Tortonian-age Diest Formation of the vicinity of Antwerp, Belgium. Ray (1976) tentatively referred to F. aberratum a humerus from Martha's Vineyard, Massachusetts.

References

Miocene pinnipeds
Prehistoric carnivoran genera
Phocines
Tortonian extinctions
Prehistoric pinnipeds of Europe
Fossil taxa described in 2018